Manoranjan Bhattacharya (1910 – 22 August 1932) was an Indian independence activist and Bengali revolutionary.

Revolutionary activities 
Bhattacharya was born at Erikati in Faridpur district of East Bengal and Assam. He joined in the revolutionary Madaripur group of Madaripur. While a student, Bhattacharya participated in the Chittagong armoury raid on 18 April 1930. His last action was a mail bag robbery in Chamugaria on 14 March 1932. During the robbery, Bhattacharya killed one post office employee when the man grappled with him.

Death 
Bhattacharya and four other revolutionaries were arrested by the police and sent to Faridpur Jail. Bhattacharya was sentenced to death on 12 May 1932, and was hanged on 22 August 1932 in Barishal district Jail. Other co-accused were sentenced to various long terms of imprisonment.

References 

1910 births
1932 deaths
Executed revolutionaries
Revolutionary movement for Indian independence
Indian independence activists from West Bengal
Indian people convicted of murder
Indian revolutionaries
Executed Indian people
People executed by British India by hanging
20th-century executions by British India